Alouette 2 was a Canadian research satellite launched at 04:48 UTC on November 29, 1965, by a Thor Agena rocket with Explorer 31 from the Western test range at Vandenberg AFB in California. It was (like its predecessor Alouette 1, and Explorer 31) designed to explore the ionosphere.

History
The name "Alouette" came from the French for "skylark" and from the title of a popular French-Canadian folk song.  Alouette 2 was also known as ISIS-X since it was the first in a series of ISIS satellites:  International Satellites for Ionospheric Studies.  The next one was called ISIS-I.

The Alouette 2 was built up from the identical backup satellite to Alouette 1. It had many more experiments and more sophisticated support systems than the earlier satellite.  It lasted for 10 years, being terminated on August 1, 1975.

RCA Victor of Montreal, Quebec, was the prime contractor; Havilland Aircraft of Toronto, Ontario, served as associate contractor.

Post mission
After the Alouette 2 was launched, the upper stage of the rocket used to launch the satellite became a derelict object that would continue to orbit Earth for many years.  , the upper stage remains in orbit.

The satellite itself became a derelict after August 1975.  It too remains in earth orbit .

References

External links

1965-098A at NSSDC
CBC Archives: Launching the Alouette 2 satellite

Satellites of Canada
Derelict satellites orbiting Earth
Spacecraft launched in 1965
Geospace monitoring satellites